The Knysna elephants were the relicts of once substantial herds of African bush elephant (Loxodonta africana) in the Outeniqua/Tsitsikamma region of southernmost South Africa. As of 2022, the herds have been reduced to a lone adult female. The elephant herds roamed the southern tip of Africa into the 1800s and 1900s, when contact with European farmers and hunters led to their decimation. It is conjectured that about 1,000 elephants historically roamed the Outeniqua/Tsitsikamma area. A 2006 DNA analysis of dung samples revealed the presence of at least 5 cows and possibly some bulls and calves, moving within an area of 121,000 hectares of forest managed by SANParks – the only unfenced elephant group in South Africa. However, by 2019, researchers realised that a mature female at the Knysna Forest was the last to survive.

History & decline
Stone Age: The semi-nomadic Khoi hunted them, and the San people of the southern Cape frequently painted rock art of them.

15th - 16th Centuries: Early Portuguese explorers discovered the Garden Route and a more conflicted relationship with the region’s wildlife began. In 1497, the Portuguese explorer Vasco da Gama saw herds of elephants in Mossel Bay.

Ivory hunting and loss of habitat to agriculture had all but exterminated elephants from the Cape region of Africa by 1900. The last elephant in the vicinity of the Cape Peninsula was killed in 1704, and elephant populations west of the Knysna region were extirpated prior to 1800. 

By 1775, the remaining Cape elephants had retreated into forests along the foothills of the Outeniqua / Tsitsikamma coastal mountain range around Knysna, and dense scrub-thickets of the Addo bush. 

1860: Due to extensive ivory hunting, the Knysna elephant was officially protected by the Cape government.

1867: However, elephant hunting was still regarded as “a rather good sport”. Prince Alfred, Duke of Edinburgh (Queen Victoria’s son) -accompanied by a large hunting party - arrived by ship to embark on an elephant hunt. The party killed two elephants and probably fatally wounded at least two other members of a herd of sixteen.

1874: Captain Harison (Conservator of Forests between 1856 and 1888) suggested to the Cape Colonial government that it was time to protect the surviving elephants. The government turned down the suggestion as “frivolous”.

1876: Captain Harison estimates 400-500 elephants remain in the region and is concerned by the rate at which elephants are being killed by hunters. He makes an appeal to the Cape Government for legislation to protect the Knysna elephants - which is denied as “hardly worthwhile to legislate…”.

1886: An act for the better preservation of game was passed, which required special permission by the Governor for killing an elephant - except for farmers who were still allowed to shoot the elephants on their property without authorization. Consequently, this caused resentment among the community, as they saw themselves being robbed of benefits provided from sport hunting and ivory.

1908: Faced with the elephants' imminent extinction, the Cape Government put them under new protection declaring them as Royal Game; meaning they could only be hunted by British royalty or with a license costing £3-25. Stricter fines for illegal hunting were imposed, as well as prohibitions regarding the hunting of females (cows) and elephants with a certain weight of tusks. Arguably, there were few individuals to enforce these laws.

Addo elephants and Major P. J. Pretorius 
By 1919, a large herd was peacefully centered about the Addo area of the Eastern Cape. Farmers in this area had been sold their farms at greatly reduced rates and favourable terms because of the elephant presence. Nevertheless, these farmers complained to the authorities about damage to their crops, broken water pipelines and reservoirs, and even loss of lives, though it later transpired that the lives lost were those of hunters tracking and killing elephants. An extermination order was given by the Provincial Administration, due to conflict between farmers and the elephants over dwindling water resources and the threat posed to the future agricultural development. Initially, only a reduction in numbers was contemplated, but, on 1 April 1919, the Administrator of the Cape - Sir Frederic de Waal - argued in favor of total extermination of all the elephants. From June 1919 to August 1920, the professional hunter Major P. J. Pretorius (i.e. the “Jungle Man”) shot a figure of "120-odd" elephants, that reduced the largest population in South Africa from about 130 to 16 individuals. Allegedly, a public debate - including key figures Rev. J.R.L. Kingon and Major Pretorius - took place, in which a handful of individuals convinced the Provincial Administration to spare 16 animals. The remaining elephants were to be left in the Addo Reserve. Later, Pretorius applied for and was granted permission by the government in 1920 to shoot one of the sequestered 16. The shooting accounted for five more elephants. Spoils from the initial part of the campaign went to the Province, but from January 1920 onwards they were the property of Pretorius, who had been approached by various museums for specimens to add to their collections – the South African Museum received four, the Amathole Museum two and eight to the British Museum of Natural History. Pretorius had been requested to record measurements of the elephants that he had shot, but these were never made available.

The Pretorius hunt 
After killing about 120 elephants in the Addo area, Major Pretorius set out to kill one Knysna elephant at a time when there were no more than seventeen left. This planned hunt was motivated as scientific research to attempt to prove that they were a subspecies and for collection for the Cape museum. The hunt for one ended terribly wrong and - out of a herd of seven - five elephants were killed (two bulls, two calves, and one cow). After this, there were approximately 7-12 elephants remaining in 1920. 

1921-1986: Much concern was raised over the elephants’ chances for survival and numerous surveys were undertaken to gain clarity on the population status. The Wildlife Society approached Nick Carter in 1969 to do an elephant survey in conjunction with the Department of Nature Conservation and Dept. of Forestry, with the help of trackers; Aapie and Anthony Stroebel.  After almost a year, 10 different elephants were identified spread across small groups with some loner, older, bulls. The Wildlife Society suggested that part of the Forest be fenced off for an elephant reserve; so to secure the elephant population’s future by potentially decreasing human-elephant conflict, shooting incidents and poaching, while increasing mating opportunities. The Dept. of Forestry later researched different options for such an area but argued that the reason for the population’s decline was habitat and diet limitations, rather than illegal killing, and concluded that such a fenced reserve would not increase the population’s chances for survival. 

1971: A senior official in the Dept. of Forestry ordered the killing of an old bull due to reported conflict with farmers. The deed was concealed and the tusks were buried, but the carcass was found launching a police investigation and publicized court-case, lasting 9-days, which ended with the accused members of the Dept. of Forestry being declared not guilty.

Remnants in the 21st century

The scattered remnants of the herds had to regroup and modify their behaviour in order to survive. Within a short period they developed the skills necessary to live in forest and adjacent fynbos where they avoided hunters. Their range had been substantially reduced and their diet had to change as they had access to less grass.

As few as four to seven individuals were believed to roam the Knysna forests in 1950, and a survey in 1969/70 placed the population at some 14 individuals, by 1970. 

Only four Knysna elephants were believed to persist in the Gouna/Diepwalle forests from 1976 to 1994, and by 1996 the population was reported to be functionally extirpated, with only a single adult female remaining. Nevertheless, in September 2000 a forest guard, Wilfred Oraai, videotaped a young bull from a distance of about thirty metres, immediately raising questions about its provenance. Conservationist Gareth Patterson has collected numerous fresh samples of elephant dung for DNA analysis by geneticist Lori S. Eggert from the University of Missouri in Columbia. In its passage through the digestive system, dung scrapes against the walls of the intestines and as a result contains DNA of the particular animal. The analysis alluded to the survival of least five females, while Patterson's fieldwork suggests the additional presence of three bulls and two calves.

In September 1994, in an effort to bolster the population, three juvenile elephants were introduced from the Kruger National Park. At the time it was believed that Knysna elephants only frequented the forest proper, and the introduction of the Kruger elephants, which at most foraged along forest margins and in fynbos, was consequently deemed a failure. One of the Kruger elephants died within a month of stress-related pneumonia, while the remaining two were relocated to Shamwari Game Reserve in 1999, after they left the forest vicinity and came into conflict with humans. Also in 1994 the Department of Water Affairs and Forestry mounted another survey and found only one other Knysna elephant left - a mature cow known as the ‘Matriarch’, aged about 45 - and stated that the Knysna elephant population was therefore 'functionally' extinct despite the DNA evidence. 

2000: A young (20 years old) bull is sighted in the forest. The Department of Water Affairs and Forestry officially stated that in 2002 there remained at least three Knysna elephants. In 2016, an elephant believed to be Oupoot was photographed by a ranger. SANParks stated their belief that between one and five elephants remained in the park, but did not disclose their location or precise numbers. 

In 2019, SANParks concluded that there was no remnant herd roaming Knysna forest, but only the shy and reclusive female. Camera-traps which monitored 38 locations in their former range for more than a year, obtained 140 photos of the single cow, estimated to be 45 years old. She frequented indigenous forest and adjacent fynbos on SANParks and neighbouring land. She was expected to live to the age of 65, which would imply another two decades of her unnaturally lone existence. A relocation to another herd was considered too stressful, and artificial insemination likely too risky. It was decided to leave her in the terrain with which she was familiar, where she would serve as a metaphor for the lamentable policy failures which doomed the population, and indifferent attitudes towards biodiversity in general.

References

External links
Addo Elephants in the Amathole Museum

Further reading
"Elephantoms: Tracking the Elephant" - Lyall Watson (Penguin, 2003) 
“The Secret Elephants” - Gareth Patterson (Penguin) 
"The Knysna Elephants and Their Forest Home" - Margo Mackay (Knysna, 1996)
"Jungle Man - The Autobiography of Major P. J. Pretorius CMG, DSO and Bar" (George G. Harrap, 1949)

Knysna
Elephants
Fauna of South Africa